Ali (’Àlī) is a Gbaya language of the southwestern Central African Republic. Ngbaka Manza is closer to ’Ali proper than it is to its namesakes Manza or Ngbaka, though all may be mutually intelligible to some extent.

References

Gbaya languages
Languages of the Central African Republic